Gold Ace was a New Zealand Standardbred racehorse. 

Gold Ace was by champion sire Bettor's Delight, out of an In The Pocket mare, Hill of Gold.  Hill of Gold retired from racing at the age of five, after fracturing her pedal bone.

Racing career

Gold Ace was trained by, and part-owned by Steven Reid. Steven Reid and Graeme Rogerson purchased Gold Ace in 2009 for $27,000.

He was a champion 3-year-old; in 2011 and 2012, he won over NZ$500,000, winning 10 of his 15 races, including the New Zealand Derby. 

Gold Ace’s earnings topped $1.2m, with 22 wins in 69 starts.  His fastest time for 1600m was 1:51.8, run at the Cambridge Raceway.

Notable races
 1st in the 2010 Sire Stakes Final beating Hands Christian and The Muskeg Express
 1st in the 2011 New Zealand Derby beating Terror to Love and Major Mark
 1st in the 2011 Golden Nugget (Gloucester Park, Perth) beating Mustang Mach and Eliminator 
 1st in the 2012 New Zealand Free For All beating Pure Power and Terror to Love

Stud career

After retiring from racing in 2015 Gold Ace commenced a stud career at Nevele R Stud in Canterbury.

His progeny include:
 Annerie (out of Feyonce, dam sire Changeover), winner of the Group Three Tasmanian Oaks who then went to North America
 Charlie’s Ace (Jennifer Capriati by Courage Under Fire) 
 Distinguished Taste (Art Buyer by Art Major)
 Dressed In Gold (Lite Polaris	by Badlands Hanover)
 Max Power (Piccadily Ellen by Art Colony)
 Pixie (Pixel by Holmes Hanover)
 Renko (Jewelz by Changeover)
 Takingcareofbusiness (Booming Jet by Jereme's Jet)
 White Diamond Gold (Redback Jars by Falcon's Idol)

See also

 Harness racing in New Zealand

References

New Zealand standardbred racehorses